Raandiah is a town of Toba Tek Singh District in the Punjab province of Pakistan. It is located at 31°5'0N 72°33'0E with an altitude of 162 metres (534 feet). Neighbouring settlements include Janiwala and Kathowal.

References

Populated places in Toba Tek Singh District